Pipeclay may refer to: 

White pipe clay, white-firing clay of the sort that is used to fashion smoking pipes
Pipeclay triangle, a piece of laboratory equipment, typically made from this material
Catlinite or Pipestone, found in Sioux Quartzite deposits in the upper midwestern and southwestern United States, that is used to fashion smoking pipes
Pipeclay National Park in Australia